Haddix is an unincorporated community and coal town in Breathitt County, Kentucky, United States. It is located near the confluence of Troublesome Creek and the North Fork Kentucky River.

The first mines opened in this area about 1852. A post office was established in 1916, and named for early settler Samuel Haddix, a native of Virginia. Its post office closed in 1994.

References

Unincorporated communities in Breathitt County, Kentucky
Unincorporated communities in Kentucky
Coal towns in Kentucky